Julie Stevenson Solt (born November 2, 1958) is a judge on the Circuit Court for Frederick County in Maryland. She is the county Administrative Judge.

Early life and education
Solt was born in Bethesda, Maryland. She attended Mount Saint Mary College, graduating summa cum laude in 1980 with a bachelor of arts. Solt then attended the University of Maryland School of Law. She graduated in 1983 cum laude with a juris doctor. Solt was admitted to Maryland Bar in 1983.

Career
Solt began her career in private practice, working from 1983 to 1989. Solt is a member of the Frederick County Bar Association and the Maryland State's Attorneys' Association. In 1990, Solt began working as the Chief Assistant State's Attorney for the Frederick County Child Support and Juvenile Division. From 1992-1998, Solt served as the Deputy States' Attorney for Frederick County.

From December 21, 1998 to March 1, 2016, Solt was an Associate Judge for the Frederick County Circuit Court. In 2000, Solt ran in a primary election against Jerome J. Joyce. In the primary, Solt received fifty-seven percent of the Republican vote and seventy-one percent of the Democratic vote. This allowed her to run unopposed on the general election ballot that fall. Solt received more than 57,500 votes in the Fall 2000 election.

During her time as an Associate Judge, Solt served on many committees and councils. Solt was a member of the Council on Jury Use and Management from 1999-2000 and a member of the Criminal Law and Procedure Committee from 2001-2004. In November 2004, Solt became the Presiding Judge for the Adult Drug Court Program and was a member of the Drug Treatment Court Commission from 2002-2006. Also beginning in 2004, Solt has served on the Maryland State Council for Interstate Adult Offender Supervision. In 2005, Solt became the Designated Judge for the Advanced Science and Technology Adjudication Resource (ASTAR) Center Program. From 2007-2008, Solt was on the Problem-Solving Courts Committee and from 2007-2008 was on the drug treatment court oversight committee.

From 2008-2014, Solt served on the Judicial Compensation Committee for the Maryland Judicial Conference. In 2009, Solt began serving on the Alternative Dispute Resolution Subcommittee for the Conference of Circuit Judges. Since 1009, Solt has also served as the chair for the Public Defender Regional Advisory Board, which advises Allegany, Carroll, Frederick, Garrett, Howard, Montgomery, and Washington counties. From 2010-2012, she was on the Ad Hoc Committee on Sentencing Alternatives, Re-Entry, and Best Practices. From 2012-2018, Solt was a member of the Judicial Ethics Committee, serving as the Vice-Chair for the committee from 2014-2018.

On March 1, 2016, Solt became the County Administrative Judge for the Frederick County Circuit Court. In April 2016, Solt ran in a primary election receiving votes from 20,151 Democrats and 20,528 Republicans. On November 8, 2016, Solt ran unopposed in the Maryland 6th Circuit Court general election for Frederick County. Her term will end in 2031. Since 2017, Solt has been a member of the Judicial Council for the Maryland Electronic Courts Advisory Committee. She was also the Circuit Representative for the 6th Judicial Circuit Conference of Circuit Judges from 2019-2020.

Personal life
Solt was on the Board of Trustees for the Big Brothers Big Sisters of Frederick County from 1984-1985. Solt is a resident of Frederick, Maryland.

References

1958 births
Living people
20th-century American judges
20th-century American lawyers
21st-century American judges
Mount Saint Mary College alumni
University System of Maryland alumni
Maryland lawyers
20th-century American women lawyers
20th-century American women judges
21st-century American women judges